Morradoo railway station is located on the Stony Point line in Victoria, Australia. It serves the town of Crib Point, and it opened on 7 November 1960 as Rail Motor Stopping Place No. 15. It was renamed Morradoo in 1996.

By November 1963, an  platform was provided at the stopping place. In December 1973, flashing light signals were provided at the Disney Road level crossing, located at the Up end of the station.

On 22 June 1981, the passenger service between Frankston and Stony Point was withdrawn and replaced with a bus service, with the line between Long Island Junction and Stony Point also closing on the same day. On 16 September 1984, promotional trips for the reopening of the line began and, on 27 September of that year, the passenger service was reinstated.

In 1996, the platform was extended to 52 metres in length, and a new shelter was erected. This made the platform the second shortest with a regular service in Victoria (the shortest being at Leawarra, on the same line). In that year, the station was renamed as the result of a local competition, with the winning entry being Morradoo, suggested by Bree Saunders of Crib Point Primary School. Morradoo comes from an Indigenous word meaning "powder and shot", and was the original name for Crib Point.

In 2011, boom barriers were provided at the Disney Road level crossing.

Platforms and services

Morradoo has one platform. It is serviced by Metro Trains' Stony Point line services.

Platform 1:
  all stations services to Frankston; all stations services to Stony Point

Transport links

Ventura Bus Lines operates one route via Morradoo station, under contract to Public Transport Victoria:
 : Frankston station – Flinders

References

External links
 Melway map at street-directory.com.au

Railway stations in Melbourne
Railway stations in Australia opened in 1960
Railway stations in the Shire of Mornington Peninsula